The 2013–14 Michigan State Spartans women's basketball team will represent Michigan State University during the 2013–14 NCAA Division I women's basketball season. The Spartans, led by seventh year head coach Suzy Merchant, play their home games at the Breslin Center and were a members of the Big Ten Conference. They finish with a record of 23–10 overall, 13–3 in Big Ten play to share the regular season title with Penn State. They lost in the semifinals of the 2014 Big Ten Conference women's basketball tournament to Nebraska. They were invited to the 2014 NCAA Division I women's basketball tournament which they defeated Hampton in the first round before losing to North Carolina in the second round.

Roster

Schedule

|-
!colspan=9| Exhibition

|-
!colspan=9| Regular Season

|-
!colspan=9| 2014 Big Ten Conference women's basketball tournament

|-
!colspan=9| NCAA women's tournament

Source

Rankings

See also
 2013–14 Michigan State Spartans men's basketball team

References

Michigan State Spartans women's basketball seasons
Michigan State
Michigan State